Viktor Alexandrovich Sidyak (born 24 November 1943) is a Russian former left-handed sabre fencer, a pupil of Mark Rakita and David Tyshler. He was known for his aggressive style and the "one-and-a-half tempo attack".

Biography
Sidyak was born in Anzhero-Sudzhensk in Kemerovo Oblast, but spent most of his childhood in Donetsk. He started fencing at age fifteen. In the 1960s, while training in Lvov, he represented Ukraine on the internal Soviet circuit. He was part of the winning team at the 1968 Summer Olympics in Mexico City. In 1970, he moved to Minsk and joined the Belarusian fencing lobby which had produced Elena Belova, Alexandr Romankov, and Nikolai Alyokhin.

At the 1972 Summer Olympics in Munich, Sidyak became the first Soviet sabreur to win individual gold. At the same Olympics, he fenced in the team final with his right eye bandaged over after having a fragment of the Italian Michele Maffei's blade removed from his eye the previous day. Besides Sidyak, the team consisted of Vladimir Nazlymov, Eduard Vinokurov, and Viktor Bazhenov. The Soviet and Italian teams met again in the finals, Italy taking gold, and USSR silver. In 1994, Maffei's 1972 teammate Mario Aldo Montano invited Sidyak to coach the young fencers, including his own son, at his club in Livorno.

At the world championships Sidyak's won an individual title in 1969 and team titles in 1969–1971, 1974, 1975 and 1979.

At present, Sidyak is the chairman of the professional boxing association of Belarus.

See also
Fencing
List of notable fencers
List of Olympic medalists in fencing (men)
Fencing terminology

References

External links
Biography from the Russian Fencing Federation (RUSSIAN)

1943 births
Living people
People from Anzhero-Sudzhensk
Soviet male sabre fencers
Russian male sabre fencers
Ukrainian male sabre fencers
Olympic fencers of the Soviet Union
Olympic gold medalists for the Soviet Union
Olympic silver medalists for the Soviet Union
Olympic bronze medalists for the Soviet Union
Olympic medalists in fencing
Fencers at the 1968 Summer Olympics
Fencers at the 1972 Summer Olympics
Fencers at the 1976 Summer Olympics
Fencers at the 1980 Summer Olympics
Armed Forces sports society athletes
Medalists at the 1968 Summer Olympics
Medalists at the 1972 Summer Olympics
Medalists at the 1976 Summer Olympics
Medalists at the 1980 Summer Olympics
Universiade medalists in fencing
Universiade gold medalists for the Soviet Union
Medalists at the 1970 Summer Universiade
Sportspeople from Kemerovo Oblast